Juan Antonio Coloma Álamos (born 14 March 1980) is a Chilean politician who currently serves as a member of the Chamber of Deputies of Chile. Similarly, he is son of the senator Juan Antonio Coloma Correa.

References

External links
 BCN Profile

1980 births
Living people
Pontifical Catholic University of Chile alumni
Francisco de Vitoria University alumni
Independent Democratic Union politicians